John Peck is an American Marine sergeant who lost both his legs and arms during a mission in Afghanistan in 2010. He lost both legs and one arm when an Improvised explosive device he stepped on exploded; while recovering in the hospital, an infection forced amputation of his remaining arm. He successfully underwent a ground-breaking bilateral arm transplant in August 2016.  

Peck wrote a book, Rebuilding Sergeant Peck: How I Put Body and Soul Back Together After Afghanistan, that was released on May 7, 2019. Also a documentary was made about him.

In 2021, Our Life released a documentary, The Man with Another Man's Arms, following Peck's recovery from bilateral arm transplant on YouTube. The video received over 5,000,000 views within its first year. He was also named Military Times Veteran of the Year for 2021.

References

American writers
United States Marine Corps personnel of the War in Afghanistan (2001–2021)
Living people
Year of birth missing (living people)
Date of birth missing (living people)